Paula Ormaechea was the defending champion, but chose not to participate.

Renata Voráčová won the title, defeating Maria Elena Camerin in the final, 3–6, 6–2, 6–0.

Seeds

Main draw

Finals

Top half

Bottom half

References 
 Main draw
 Qualifying draw

Royal Cup NLB Montenegro - Singles